The 2018 National Rugby Championship was the fifth season of the top flight of Australian domestic rugby union. The competition began on 1 September and concluded on 27 October. Matches were broadcast on Fox Sports and the championship featured eight professional teams, seven from Australia and one from Fiji.

The Fijian Drua won their first NRC title, defeating reigning champion side  by 36–26 in the grand final held at Churchill Park in Lautoka. The Drua secured home ground advantage in the final by winning the minor premiership for the regular season and then beating  in their semifinal. Queensland Country defeated the Western Force in the other semifinal to progress to the grand final. Fijian Drua also finished the season as winners of the Horan-Little Shield for 2018.

Teams
There were two major changes for the 2018 season. The Greater Sydney Rams team was removed from the competition, leaving New South Wales with two participating sides in the NRC, one Sydney team and one Country team. In Perth, the Western Force replaced Perth Spirit as the team in Western Australia, following the removal of the Force from the Super Rugby competition in 2018. The eight teams for the 2018 NRC season include two from New South Wales, two from Queensland, and one each from Australian Capital Territory, Victoria, Western Australia, and Fiji:

Television coverage and streaming 
Two of the NRC matches each weekend are broadcast live via Fox Sports, with the remaining matches shown live on the Fox Sports streaming platform.  Discussion of the NRC competition is included on the Fox Sports review show NRC Extra Time on Monday nights, and the Kick & Chase program on Wednesday evenings.

Experimental Law Variations
World Rugby adopted all global law variations being trialled as of May 2018 into the rugby law book with immediate effect. As such, the NRC 2017 trial changes to Laws 15, 16 and 20 (renumbered as 14, 15 and 19 in the simplified 2018 laws) were officially incorporated by World Rugby and thus became variations no more. The other law variations used for the NRC in 2017 were retained for the 2018 season.

Regular season 
The eight teams competed in a round-robin tournament for the regular season. During this section of the competition, teams also played for the Horan-Little Shield, a challenge trophy put on the line when a challenge is accepted by the holders or mandated by the terms of competition for the shield.

Points for the regular season standings were accumulated by the same method as for The Rugby Championship and Super Rugby. A slightly modified version of the standard competition points system was used, with a bonus point awarded to a winning team scoring at least 3 tries more than their opponent; and a bonus point awarded to a losing team defeated by a margin of 7 points or under. Four points were awarded for a win and none for a loss; two points were awarded to each team if a match was drawn.

Each team's placement was based on its cumulative points total, including any bonus points earned. For teams level on table points, tiebreakers apply in the following order:
 Difference between points for and against during the season.
 Head-to-head match result(s) between the tied teams.
 Total number tries scored during the season.

The top four teams at the end of the regular season qualified for the title play-offs in the form of semi-finals followed by a final to determine the champion team.

Standings

Team progression

Competition rounds

All times are local (and subject to change).

Round 1

Round 2

Round 3

Round 4

Round 5

Round 6

Round 7

Title playoffs

Semi-finals

Final

Statistics

Leading point scorers

Leading try scorers

2018 Emerging States Championship 
From 2018 an additional competition was formed for teams from so-called "Emerging States", featuring the Adelaide Black Falcons, Victoria Country Barbarians, Northern Territory Mosquitoes and Tasmania Jack Jumpers. The first Competition was held in Adelaide in September 2018, and the Black Falcons were the inaugural winners.

Notes

References

External links
NRC  on Rugby.com.au
NRC on Fox Sports
NRC Live on twitter.com

Team webpages

2018 in Australian rugby union
2018 rugby union tournaments for clubs
2018 National Rugby Championship